The 2020–2021 Vendée Globe was a non-stop round the world yacht race for IMOCA 60 class yachts crewed by only one person. It was the ninth edition of the race, which started and finished in Les Sables-d'Olonne, France. The race began on 8 November 2020, with the first finishers completing the course on 27 January 2021 with the 25th and final yacht to complete the race arrived on 5 March 2021.

Report
With a record number of 33 starter and 25 finishers, there was also a record number of six female competitors. This race was exceptionally close with the first eight sailors separated by less than 24 hours and literally with 12 hours to go the winner was not determined. The reason for this was due to compression in the fleet caused by the weather systems in addition to the large number of competitive entries and some of the pre race favorites being amongst the none finishers.

Media Exposure
The international media exposure reached an all-time high in part due to the event being able to proceed during the COVID-19 pandemic due to its naturally isolative nature. With social mobility limited and large sectors of nations work force not working the race filled a void while other sport competitions were cancelled. The main spectator negatives happened at a national level with the race village not getting the usual hundred of thousands of visitors. The hardest thing for the international sailors was who could welcome them at the race finish with close family unable to attend, there was also reduced spectators and the race organisers made sure all the French competitors entered the finishing port during daylight hours to avoid the curfew restrictions.

The international coverage was led by daily show broadcasts on YouTube, Daily Motion and Facebook with the English edition lead by Andi Robertson. The openness of the skippers to media varied, with Pip Hare and Boris Herrmann engaging extensively with online broadcast. There was also increasing media participation with the French skippers in the race. In terms of openness even at the front of the fleet the intentions of some sailors were open while others hid both sail plans and the extent of damage to the other boats until after the race finish.

It had high-profile followers with French President Emmanuel Macron and the Crown Prince of Monaco engaging in the race and its media.

Alongside the race for the fourth time a web based online routing game mirroring the race ran by Virtual Regatta this was the largest ever online sailing game with 1,000,000 unique users. It was won by French sailor Jean-Claude Goudon, whose user name was “tigrou26120,” finished in a time of 68 days, 22 hours, 16 minutes and 4 seconds.

Human Interest
The unique thing about the Vendee Globe is the characters involved due to the challenges. Sailors that waited to the last minute allowing them to secure sponsorship were Alexia Barrier, Ari Huusela and Pip Hare. Sailors had different objectives – from Ari Huusela on a lifetime adventure with the only aim to complete the race through to the long time challengers like Alex Thompson who had a win at all cost mentality.

Former winner Alain Gautier in post race explained how Benjamin Dutreux, Damien Seguin, Yannick Bestaven and Louis Burton were the few sailing their boats closest to their potential in terms of speed, but he also admired the approach of Boris Herrmann who had a more conservative approach.

Incidents

PRB sinking and rescue
A major incident occurred when  on day 22 of the race had a hull failure and he was rescued by fellow competitor . He later described how the boat literally folded in half and he struggled to release the life raft due to the speed of the situation.

The sailors that were involved in the rescue were awarded time compensation by the International Jury for their assistance with the following
(1) Le Cam was awarded a 16hr 15min time compensation for rescuing Kevin Escoffier.
(2) Herrmann was awarded a 6hr time compensation for aiding in the rescue of Kevin Escoffier.
(3) Bestaven was awarded a 10hr 15min time compensation for aiding in the rescue of Kevin Escoffier.

Hydrofoil damage
The introduction of hydrofoils to the 2016 edition of the race lead to their largescale adoption amongst the fleet. There was intense discussion about the cost, efficiency, vulnerability, sea keeping effects and structural implication of the development. Certainly their efficiency was shown with both "L’Occitane En Provence" and "Charal" sailing through the fleet and the foiler finishing in the top 3 position winning the short drag race to the finish the weather systems created.

Both Thomas Ruyant and Charlie Dalin suffered hydrofoil issues that compromised their race. Boris Herrmann also suffered foil damage in his collision with a fishing boat although it could be argued the impact to the foils stopped the deck spreaders from breaking. The sinking of PRB and its links to foil is at present unknown but certainly the boat had undergone extensive modification to refit and Kevin described the way the boat accelerated before failing. Their benefits in a seaway was also questioned as was the ride given by semi foiling nature with sailors saying the fully retractable foil configuration had distinct advantages in extreme conditions.

Rudder damage
On the third day Jérémie Beyou onboard Charal returned to the start to repair a damaged rudder due to a collision with a floating object, he started again 9 days 2 h 50 min after the initial fleet start. Pip Hare on Medallia discovered cracks to her rudder stock and replaced the rudder with a spare near Cape Horn. Alex Thomson on Hugo Boss 7 retired with steering issues.

Collisions
Boris Herrmann on Sea Explorer – Yacht Club De Monaco was 90 miles from the finish line when he hit a fishing boat causing extensive damage to the boat. Due to the proximity to the finish line he was able to finish the race. Sam Davies retired due to an impact with unidentified floating object.

Results

§ – boat equipped with hydrofoils

Competitors

References

External links
 Official Website
 Official You Tube Channel
 Official Facebook Page

Vendée Globe
Vendée Globe
Vendée Globe
Vendée Globe
Vendée Globe